In mathematics, in the representation theory of groups, a group is said to be representation rigid if for every , it has only finitely many isomorphism classes of complex irreducible representations of dimension .

External links
 The proalgebraic completion of rigid groups

Properties of groups
Representation theory of groups